Asquarius (1992) is the third studio album released by the Leeds-based indie rock band Cud which reached number 30 in the UK album chart. Q magazine included it in their 1998 issue as part of their essential dozen Britpop records to have in your collection. The album was reissued in 2007 in expanded form. The album was recorded at Woodlands in Castleford, except for "Possessions", which was recorded at Woodhouse in Leeds in January 1992. Mixing took place at Jacobs in Farnham, and Metropolis in London in February 1992. The recordings were mainly produced by Jon Langford, except for "Possessions", which was produced by Dave Creffield; the latter served as engineer throughout the sessions, with assistance from Neil Amor.

Track listing 
All songs written by Mike Dunphy and Carl Puttnam, except "Beyond Hair" and "Possession" by Cud.

 "Rich and Strange" – 3:38  	    	
 "Easy" – 2:44 	  	
 "Sometimes Rightly, Sometimes Wrongly" – 3:10 	  	
 "Spanish Love Song" – 3:25 	  	
 "Magic Alex" – 4:16 	  	
 "Beyond Hair" – 3:12 	  	
 "Pink Flamingo" – 3:50 	  	
 "Possession" – 3:41 	  	
 "Through the Roof" – 3:59 	  	
 "Soul Food" – 2:56 	  	
 "Once Again" – 5:07 	  	
 "No Smoking" – 3:29

Bonus tracks on 2007 reissue 
"Do It Again"
 "Ariel" (instrumental version)
 "Profession"
 "Spanish Love Song" (acoustic)
 "Purple Love Balloon" (live BBC Sound City session)
 "Possession" (live BBC Sound City session)

Personnel
Personnel per booklet.

Cud
 Carl Puttnam – vocals
 Mike Dunphy – guitars
 William Potter – bass guitar
 Steve Goodwin – drums

Additional musicians
 Martin Ditcham – percussion (tracks 1 and 11)
 Susie Honeyman – violin (tracks 1 and 11)
 Tris Williams – additional percussion (track 4)
 The Fantom Horns – horns (track 5)
 Richard Sutton – trumpet
 Miles Tranter – tenor saxophone
 David Tyler – trombone
 Steve Fantom – trombone
 Jon Langford – keyboards (track 5), additional acoustic guitar (track 11)
 Dave Creffield – keyboards (track 5)
 Mark Dunphy – harmonica (track 10)

Production and design
 Jon Langford – producer (all except track 8)
 Dave Creffield – producer (track 8), engineer
 Neil Amor – assistant
 Cud – sleeve concept
 Tim Jarvis – band photography
 T&CP Associates – design, artwork

References

External links 
 

Cud (band) albums
1992 albums
A&M Records albums